PESA Swing is a tram manufactured by a Polish company PESA in Bydgoszcz. It is a 100% low-floor, five-section vehicle based on the 120N model.

The first company to order PESA 120Na Swing trams was Warsaw Tramway, which ordered 186 units. The delivery started in summer 2010 and it is expected that by the end of 2012 already about 100 units will have been delivered.

Operators

References

External links

  Technical data at the manufacturer's website

Tram vehicles of Poland
PESA trams